Tyresån Lake System (Swedish: Tyresåns sjösystem) is a number of lakes in Sweden with a common basin of 251.5 km2.

It includes the following thirty lakes:

 Ådran
 Ågestasjön
 Albysjön Barnsjön
 Bylsjön
 Dammträsk
 Drevviken
 Fatburen
 Flaten
 Grändalssjön
 Gömmaren
 Hacksjön
 Kvarnsjön-Gladö
 Kvarnsjön-Lissma
 Kärrsjön
 Lissmasjön
 Lycksjön
 Långsjön
 Magelungen
 Mörtsjön
 Nedre Rudan
 Orlången
 Ormputten
 Övre Rudan
 Ramsjön
 Rudträsket
 Svartsjön
 Trehörningen-Hanveden
 Trehörningen-Sjödalen
 Trylen
 Träsket
 Tyresö-Flaten

References

External links
http://www.tyresan.se/

Södermanland